Benedictine Monastery of the Holy Trinity is a Benedictine monastery in Las Condes, Santiago Province, Chile noted for its modernist architecture.

Architecture 
The monastery was designed by Martín Correa Prieto and Gabriel Guarda in 1961 and constructed from 1962 to 1964. In designing the building, Prieto and Guarda focused on the manipulation of light. 

The building was designated a National Monument of Chile in 1981.

Gallery

References 

Religious buildings and structures completed in 1964
Churches in Santiago Metropolitan Region
Modernist architecture in Chile